Bentley's Bandbox is an Australian television series which aired 1960 on ABC. It featured Dick Bentley, John Bluthal, Diana Davidson, and Hazel Phillips, and was a variety show. Six episodes were produced, with ABC following the BBC model of having short seasons for its series.

The archival status of the series is not known, though a 1960 newspaper article confirms that telerecordings were made of the series.

Reception
Australian Women's Weekly said of the first episode "it was slick, smooth, beautifully done, despite a couple of first-night technical blues" and complained that the series suffered from a bad time-slot.

References

External links
Bentley's Bandbox on IMDb

1960 Australian television series debuts
1960 Australian television series endings
Black-and-white Australian television shows
English-language television shows
Australian live television series
Australian variety television shows
Australian Broadcasting Corporation original programming